Tyrone Keys (born October 24, 1960) is a former professional American football player who played defensive end for six seasons for the Chicago Bears, Tampa Bay Buccaneers, and San Diego Chargers. He was a member of the Bears team that won Super Bowl XX following the 1985 NFL season.  He was also a member of the "Shuffling Crew" in the video The Super Bowl Shuffle. In high school Keys was a member of the Callaway High School Chargers of Jackson, Mississippi which won all 12 of their 1975 season games and won the Big 8 Conference championship (the Big 8 was at the time the conference of Mississippi's largest high schools). In college at Mississippi State University Keys played four years at defensive tackle. In 1980 Keys made a last minute tackle of Alabama quarterback Don Jacobs, causing a fumble which sealed the Bulldogs' 6–3 upset of the #1 Crimson Tide.

References

1960 births
Living people
American football defensive ends
American football linebackers
Canadian football defensive linemen
BC Lions players
Chicago Bears players
Mississippi State Bulldogs football players
San Diego Chargers players
Tampa Bay Buccaneers players
Players of American football from Jackson, Mississippi
Players of Canadian football from Jackson, Mississippi
African-American players of American football
African-American players of Canadian football
21st-century African-American people
20th-century African-American sportspeople